Michael W. Macy is a Cornell University sociologist who is the Director of the Social Dynamics Laboratory and Distinguished Professor of Arts and Sciences in Sociology.  In his profile in the Information Sciences department, it says he is the Goldwin Smith of Arts and Sciences in Sociology.

Biography
Macy was born in 1948 in Clarksville, Tennessee.

He attended Harvard University for his B.A. and Ph.D. and his M.A. was from Stanford University. He was a fellow at the N.I.A.S. (Netherlands Institute for Advanced Study) from February to June 2002 and at Stanford’s Center for Advanced Study in the Behavioral Sciences from 2011 until 2012.

Research
Using a National Science Foundation grant, he and his team have “used computational models, online laboratory experiments, and digital traces of device-mediated interaction to explore familiar but enigmatic social patterns.” he has also focused on political polarization.  He has published in Science, American Journal of Sociology and American Sociological Review.

Ph.D. Students
Students he has supervised include Damon Centola and Arnout van de Rijt (both in sociology) and in information sciences, Sterling Williams-Ceci.

References

External links
Google Scholar
Social Wormholes and Parallel Worlds

1948 births
People from Clarksville, Tennessee
Living people
American sociologists
Harvard College alumni
Harvard Graduate School of Arts and Sciences alumni
Stanford University alumni
Cornell University faculty